Battapoor is a village in Telangana, India. It is located in yergatla mandal, Nizamabad district. The PIN is 503308. 90% of the population depends on agriculture. The main language is Telugu.

A 1792 book refers to the town of Shapoor as near Battapur.

See also
 List of districts of India

External links

 Lists names, ages, gender and health status of 47 people, many of whom may have been residents of the village.

References

Villages in Nizamabad district